Ross Merle Masonholder (December 16, 1943 – March 26, 2018) was an American football and wrestling coach. He served as the head football coach at Carroll College—now known as Carroll University—in Waukesha, Wisconsin from 1982 to 2000 and Central Methodist University in Fayette, Missouri from 2001 to 2007, compiling a career college football coaching record of 108–142. Masonholder was also the head wrestling coach at Coe College in Cedar Rapids, Iowa from 1969 to 1971 and Cornell College in Mount Vernon, Iowa from 1971 to 1977.

Playing career
Masonholder played college football at the State College of Iowa—now known as the University of Northern Iowa—where he was a two-time first team "All-Conference" tackle and received honorable mention as an All-American athlete.

Coaching career

Early coaching career
Masonholder began his coaching career in 1966 at Iowa Valley High School in Marengo, Iowa, where he was head football and head wrestling coach for three years. In 1969, he was hired as head wrestling coach at Coe College in Cedar Rapids, Iowa. In 1971, Masonholder moved on to Cornell College in Mount Vernon, Iowa as head wrestling coach.

Carroll
Masonholder was the 26th head football coach at Carroll College—now known as Carroll University—in Waukesha, Wisconsin, serving for 19 seasons, from 1982 to 2000. His coaching record at Carroll was 88–87.

Central Methodist
Masonholder became the head football coach at Central Methodist University in Fayette, Missouri in 2001, serving until the conclusion of the 2007 season.  While at CMU, he oversaw many positive changes in the football program and athletic department.

Head coaching record

College football

References

External links
 

1943 births
2018 deaths
American football tackles
Carroll Pioneers football coaches
Central Methodist Eagles football coaches
Cornell Rams football coaches
Morningside Mustangs football coaches
Northern Iowa Panthers football players
College wrestling coaches in the United States
High school football coaches in Iowa
High school wrestling coaches in the United States
Truman State University alumni
Sportspeople from Davenport, Iowa